Conrad Lawrence Goode (born January 9, 1962) is an American actor, screenwriter, film producer, musician, artist and former professional NFL player.

Early life and education 
Goode was born in Columbia, Missouri and attended Parkway Central High School. He is the stepson of Irv Goode and the son of former Mizzou All-American Conrad Hitchler. He played college football at the University of Missouri and was named a first-team All-American in 1983 by the United Press.

Career 
He was drafted in the 1984 NFL Draft by the New York Giants. He played two seasons with the Giants and one with the Tampa Bay Buccaneers, appearing in 35 games and starting in four of them. His acting debut was with Joe Piscopo in a Miller Lite commercial in 1986. In 1987, he moved into television with an appearance on Saturday Night Live and The Adventures of Superboy''''.

In 1990, he moved to Los Angeles. Over the next thirty-two years he appeared in commercials, motion pictures and television. He is a published poet and is also a composer. He produced his first feature film, Watercolor Postcards. Goode has appeared in more than thirty films, including Paul Blart: Mall Cop 2, Don't Say A Word, Con Air, Anger Management, Me, Myself and Irene and The Longest Yard. He has appeared in 40 national commercials and a dozen television shows. He most recently wrote, produced and starred along with Laura Bell Bundy and Bailee Madison in the film Watercolor Postcards in 2014.

Filmography

Film

Television

References

External links

1962 births
Male actors from Missouri
American football offensive linemen
Living people
Missouri Tigers football players
New York Giants players
Tampa Bay Buccaneers players
Players of American football from Missouri
Sportspeople from Columbia, Missouri